İkizkuyu is a village in the Nurdağı District, Gaziantep Province, Turkey. The village is inhabited by Arabs and had a population of 142 in 2022.

References

Villages in Nurdağı District